Bearden High School is a Knox County, Tennessee, high school located in the Bearden area in the city of Knoxville.

The school was founded in 1939. It was named for the family of Marcus De LaFayette Bearden, a farmer who served as a captain in the Union Army during the Civil War.

The current building was built in 1967 finished in 1969, and replaced the old building that eventually became Bearden Elementary School. The current principal is Debbie Sayers who became Principal in the 2019–2020 school year. Bearden High School athletic teams are dubbed "The Bulldogs." Bearden's rivals are the Farragut Admirals, West Rebels, and Maryville Red Rebels.

Athletics
The school plays football, baseball, women's basketball, track and field, volleyball, men's basketball, soccer, softball, dance, swimming and diving, wrestling, rugby, climbing, and marching band competitively.

Notable alumni

 Stephen Bassett - professional cyclist of Silber Pro Cycling
 Brian Bell - Weezer guitar player
 Tim Burchett - former Tennessee State Senator and Knox County Mayor and current U.S. Congressman representing the Second District.
 Brett Carroll - Former MLB Player.
 Ashley Cleveland - Grammy Award-winning gospel rock singer/songwriter
 Britton Colquitt - Minnesota Vikings professional American football player, formerly of University of Tennessee
 Dustin Colquitt - Pittsburgh Steelers professional American football player, formerly of University of Tennessee, co-founder of TeamSmile
 Dale Dickey - actress known for her role as "Patty the Daytime Hooker" in My Name is Earl
 Mike DiFelice - Major League Baseball catcher
 Phil Garner - former Houston Astros manager
 Dennis Hwang - graphic designer for Google
Bobby Ogdin – recording session pianist, member of Elvis Presley's TCB Band, the Marshall Tucker Band and Ween
 Nick Raskulinecz - record producer
 Aaron Schoenfeld (born 1990) - American-Israeli professional soccer player for the Minnesota United MLS franchise
Will Schusterick (born 1992) - professional disc golf player
Lane Thomas (born 1995) - MLB player for the St. Louis Cardinals
 Thomas Varlan (born 1956) - US Federal Judge
 Bernie L. Wade - Bishop, International Circle of Faith
 Holly Warlick - Former University of Tennessee Women's Basketball Head Coach
 Chris Woodruff - professional tennis player

References

External links
 Knox County Schools Site
 Knoxville.com Profile of Bearden High School

Public high schools in Tennessee
Schools in Knoxville, Tennessee
1939 establishments in Tennessee